Jae-kyung is a Korean unisex given name.  The meaning differs based on the hanja used to write each syllable of the name. There are 20 hanja with the reading "jae" and 54 hanja with the reading "kyung" on the South Korean government's official list of hanja which may be used in given names.

People with this name include:
Pak Jae-gyong (born 1933), North Korean male general and politician
Cha Jae-kyung (born 1971), South Korean female handball player
Jane Shin (born Shin Jae-kyung, 1980), South Korean-born Canadian female politician
Park Jae-kyung (golfer) (born 1984), South Korean male golfer
Kim Jae-kyung (born 1988), South Korean female singer

See also
List of Korean given names

References

Korean unisex given names